The 2020–21 Zambia Super League is the 60th season of the Zambia Super League, the top-tier football league in Zambia. The league kicked off on 30 October 2020.  ZESCO United are the champions. Indeni, Young Green Eagles, Kitwe United and Prison Leopards are the newly promoted sides into the super league.

Teams

Standings

Top-scorers

References

External links
RSSSF

Zambia Super League
Super League
Zambia